The South Carolina opioid overdose prevention bill is legislation sponsored in the South Carolina state legislature (House of Representatives). The bill, numbered SC H.B. 4711 and sponsored by state Representative Russell Fry, would require prescribers to offer a prescription for naloxone (or other equivalent opioid overdose medication) to patients at high risk of an opioid overdose.

Background 
Beginning in the 1990s the United States experienced an opiate abuse and addiction epidemic, initially set in motion by the over-prescribing of opioid pain medication by physicians. Between 1999 and 2017, more than 399,000 people died from drug overdoses that involved either prescription or illicit opiate drugs.

Naloxone is a prescription medication that reverses the effects of an opioid overdose, often in seconds. An opioid overdose halts breathing, which is why overdoses are often fatal. The administration of naloxone via nasal spray or direct injection can quickly restart breathing in an overdose victim.

In 2018, there were 835 opioid overdose deaths in South Carolina, an increase from 2016 which saw 628 deaths. Overall in the U.S. in 2018, there were 67,367 overdose deaths involving opioid drugs, a 4.1% decline nationwide from 2017. According to the National Institute on Drug Abuse, “Deaths involving synthetic opioids other than methadone (mainly fentanyl and fentanyl analogs) continued to rise from 404 (8.5 per thousand) in 2017 to 510 (10.8/thousand) in 2018.”

Legislation 
The bill requires medical practitioners to offer a prescription for naloxone (or equivalent) to certain at-risk patients. Specifically, physicians and other prescribers shall “offer a prescription for a drug approved by the United States Food and Drug Administration for the complete or partial reversal of opioid depression.”

At-risk patients are defined as patients who fit any of the following criteria:

 Are currently prescribed 90 or more morphine milligram equivalents of an opioid medication per day; or
 Have a concurrent prescription for a benzodiazepine drug; or
 Have an increased risk of overdose, defined as “a patient with a history of overdose, a patient with a history of substance use disorder, or a patient at risk for returning to a high dose of opioid medication to which the patient is no longer tolerant.”

The legislation also requires the prescriber to provide patient education about opioid overdose.

Legislative action 
The legislation was introduced in the South Carolina House of Representatives on January 14, 2020 by state Representative Russell Fry. On February 20, 2020, the Committee on Medical, Military, Public and Municipal Affairs passed the bill. Debate in the full state House is pending as of March 3, 2020.

As of July 1, 2020, the bill had 25 cosponsors.

See also 

 California Naloxone Requirement Bill
 Colorado Harm Reduction Substance Use Disorders Law
 Illinois Opioids-Covid-19-Naloxone Resolution
 New Jersey Opioid Antidote Prescription Bill
 New York Mandatory Opioid Antagonist Prescription Bill

References

External links

 “Opioid Epidemic,” South Carolina Department of Health and Environmental Control, Bureaus of Drug Control
 “Opioid Mortality and Selected Trends: 2017 South Carolina Overdose Mortality Data,” South Carolina Department of Alcohol and Other Drug Abuse Services

United States state health legislation